"Éthiopie" is a charity song recorded in 1985 by the collective band known under the name 'Chanteurs sans Frontières'. The song achieved a huge success in France, topping the chart for two months and becoming one of the best-selling singles in that country.

Background and writing

Chanteurs sans Frontières was a French association founded in 1985 following the English-speaking world model of the bands Band Aid and USA for Africa with the same purpose: providing assistance to victims of the famine then raging in Ethiopia. The association was presided by Antoine di Zazzo, the general director of EMI Pathé Marconi, and was led by Dominique Quiliquini (Renaud's wife), Francis Cabrel (treasurer), Franck Langolff (composer of music) and Rony Brauman (president of Médecins sans Frontières). The idea of a single was found by Valérie Lagrange and under the direction of Renaud.

The song was written by Renaud and the music composed by Franck Langolff. It was produced by Franck Langolff and Thomas Noton.

The total donations reached 23,000,000 francs distributed to various associations : Médecins sans Frontières (90%), AICF, Médecins du monde, and Restos du Cœur.

Track listing
 "Ethiopie" — 5:25
 "Ethiopie" (instrumental) — 4:07

Artists who participated in the song
These are the artists who participated in the recordings:

 Jean-Louis Aubert
 Hugues Aufray
 Josiane Balasko
 Daniel Balavoine
 Didier Barbelivien
 Axel Bauer
 Michel Berger
 Richard Berry
 Gérard Blanchard
 Francis Cabrel
 Louis Chédid
 Coluche
 Charlélie Couture
 Hervé Christiani
 Christophe
 Julien Clerc
 Michel Delpech
 Gérard Depardieu

 Diane Dufresne
 France Gall
 Jean-Jacques Goldman
 Richard Gotainer
 Jacques Higelin
 Valérie Lagrange
 Catherine Lara
 Maxime Le Forestier
 Olive, member of the band Lili Drop
 Jeane Manson
 Nicolas Peyrac
 Renaud
 Véronique Sanson
 Alain Souchon
 Diane Tell
 Fabienne Thibeault
 Trust
 Laurent Voulzy

Charts performances and sales
The single went straight to number 6 on the French SNEP Singles Chart, on May 18, 1985. It jumped to number 1 the following weeks and stayed at the top for eight consecutive weeks. After that, the single slowly dropped but remained for 14 weeks in the top ten and 22 weeks on the chart (top 50).

Certified Gold disc by the SNEP in 1985 for 500,000 copies sold.

Certifications

Charts

References

1985 singles
All-star recordings
Chanteurs sans Frontières songs
Charity singles
SNEP Top Singles number-one singles
Aid songs for Africa
1985 songs
Songs written by Renaud